The Orto Botanico "Pietro Castelli" dell'Università di Messina (8000 m²), also known as the Orto botanico di Messina, is a botanical garden operated by the University of Messina and located at Piazza 20 Settembre, Messina, Sicily, Italy.

The university's first botanical garden was established in 1638 by Pietro Castelli, but destroyed by the Spanish along with the rest of the university in 1678. Although in 1889 the garden was reestablished on the banks of the river Portalegni, this second version was ruined by the earthquake of 1908, and most of its site then devoted to building construction.

Specimens
Today the garden's trees include: 
 
 Calodendrum capensis
 Casuarina torulosa
 Chorisia insignis
 Dracaena draco
 Ficus macrophylla
 Ginkgo biloba
 Livistona chinensis
 Phoenix canariensis
 Pinus brutia
 Pinus longifolia
 Pterocarya caucasica
 Trachycarpus excelsius
 Washingtonia filifera

Other plants of interest include: 
 
 Anona cherimolia
 Eugenia jambos
 Eugenia myrtifolia
 Eugenia uniflora
 Feijoa sellowiana
 Flacourtia indica
 Mangifera indica
 Nymphaea capensis
 Nymphaea alba
 Persea gratissima
 Pithecoctenium cynanchoides
 Pontederia cordata
 Psidium guajava
 Psidium cattleianum

Bibliography 
Erik Neil, The Hortus Messanensis of Pietro Castelli. Science, Landscape, and Collecting in 17th Century Messina, in "Lexicon. Storie e architettura in Sicilia" n. 1, 2005

See also 
 List of botanical gardens in Italy

References 
 Official site (in Italian)
 Torrese description and photos (Italian)
 Messinaweb description and photos (Italian)
 Comune of Messina description (Italian)

Botanical gardens in Italy
Buildings and structures in Messina
Gardens in Sicily
1638 establishments in Italy
1678 disestablishments in Italy
1889 establishments in Italy